Stylurus is a genus of dragonflies in the family Gomphidae. They are commonly known as Hanging Clubtails from their habit of hanging nearly vertically when they perch.

The genus contains the following species:
Stylurus amicus 
Stylurus amnicola  - Riverine Clubtail
Stylurus annulatus 
Stylurus clathratus 
Stylurus endicotti 
Stylurus erectocornus 
Stylurus falcatus 
Stylurus flavicornis 
Stylurus flavipes  - River Clubtail
Stylurus gaudens 
Stylurus gideon 
Stylurus intricatus  - Brimstone Clubtail
Stylurus ivae  - Shining Clubtail
Stylurus kreyenbergi 
Stylurus laurae  - Laura's Clubtail
Stylurus nagoyanus 
Stylurus nanningensis 
Stylurus nobilis 
Stylurus notatus   - Elusive Clubtail
Stylurus occultus 
Stylurus oculatus 
Stylurus olivaceus  - Olive Clubtail
Stylurus placidus 
Stylurus plagiatus  - Russet-tipped Clubtail
Stylurus potulentus  - Yellow-sided Clubtail
Stylurus scudderi  - Zebra Clubtail
Stylurus spiniceps  - Arrow Clubtail
Stylurus takashii 
Stylurus tongrensis 
Stylurus townesi  - Towne's Clubtail

References

Gomphidae
Taxa named by James George Needham
Anisoptera genera
Taxonomy articles created by Polbot
Taxobox binomials not recognized by IUCN